Tanguy Gérald Cosyns (born 29 June 1991) is a Belgian field hockey player who plays as a forward for Racing Club de Bruxelles and the Belgium national team.

Club career
Tanguy started hockey at 4 years old at Royal Daring. He made his debut in the senior team at 16 while winning the U18 national title in 2009. He then moved to the Waterloo Ducks with whom he won two national titles in 2012 and 2013. After this experience, he returned to the club from his beginnings and helped him to reach the Euro Hockey League Final Four in 2015.

In 2018, he took on a new challenge by joining the Dutch championship. He made his first season there with HGC (reaching 3rd place and the European ticket) before moving to Amsterdamsche H&BC this last season scoring 17 goals before the season was unfortunately shortened because of the COVID-19 crisis. After three season in the Netherlands he returned to Belgium and joined Racing. He scored a hattrick in the second match of the 2021–22 championship final to win the national title with Racing.

International career
After winning the U18 (2009) and U21 (2012) European titles, he joined the senior squad in 2013. His first selection in a competition was for the Men's FIH Hockey World League Round 2 hosted by Saint Germain HC. His first major event was the 2014 Men's Hockey World Cup in The Hague where he finished in 5th place, scoring 5 goals. He was part of the Belgian men's team that won the silver medal at 2016 Summer Olympics in Rio de Janeiro scoring 5 goals.

Personal/others 
In 2017 he was sidelined due to an anterior cruciate ligament rupture. The surgery was operated by Professor Dr Johan Bellemans. He took advantage of this time spent off the field to think about the development of a hockey brand.

Honours

Club
Waterloo Ducks
 Belgian Hockey League: 2011–12, 2012–13
Racing
 Belgian Hockey League: 2021–22

International
Belgium U21
 EuroHockey Junior Championship: 2012
Belgium
 Olympic silver medal: 2016
 FIH Pro League: 2020–21

References

External links
 

1991 births
Living people
Belgian male field hockey players
Male field hockey forwards
Field hockey players from Brussels
2014 Men's Hockey World Cup players
Field hockey players at the 2016 Summer Olympics
Olympic field hockey players of Belgium
Olympic silver medalists for Belgium
Olympic medalists in field hockey
Medalists at the 2016 Summer Olympics
HGC players
Waterloo Ducks H.C. players
Amsterdamsche Hockey & Bandy Club players
Men's Hoofdklasse Hockey players
Men's Belgian Hockey League players
Expatriate field hockey players
Belgian expatriate sportspeople in the Netherlands
Royal Daring players
2023 Men's FIH Hockey World Cup players